AZ Ice Gilbert is an ice arena and skating center located in Gilbert, Arizona. It was previously home to the Phoenix Knights of the Western States Hockey League and is the current home of the Arizona Hockey Union youth program.

References

Indoor ice hockey venues in the United States
2009 establishments in Arizona
Sports venues completed in 2009